Anqasi (Quechua for cobalt salt used for dyeing, hispanicized spelling  Anccase) is a mountain in the Andes of Peru, about  high. It is located in the Arequipa Region, Caylloma Province, Chuca District. It lies northwest of Sullk'a Chuqa at a little lake named Anqasiqucha ("cobalt salt lake", hispanicized Ancasecocha).

References 

Mountains of Peru
Mountains of Arequipa Region